British Tar was launched at Shields in 1803. She first appeared in Lloyd's Register (LR) in 1803.

British Tar may have been the transport f that name that participated in the Battle of Copenhagen (1807). She was one of several transports that the commander-in-chief had ordered to be armed and that were carrying pennants. 

British Tar was last listed in 1811 with unchanged data.

Notes and citations
Notes

Citations

1803 ships
Ships built on the River Tyne
Age of Sail merchant ships of England